Dana Leigh Murray is an American animator and film producer, best known for being the producer on the 2020 Pixar film Soul, for which she has won an Academy Award for Best Animated Feature Film at the 93rd Academy Awards, alongside its director and co-producer Pete Docter.

Filmography
 2020: Soul (producer)
 2019: Smash and Grab (Short) (executive producer)
 2017: Lou (Short) (producer)
 2015: Inside Out (production manager)
 2012: Brave (art manager)
 2010: Kilo (Short) (production manager)
 2009: Up (layout manager)
 2007: Ratatouille (lighting manager)
 2006: Lifted (Short) (production coordinator)
 2005: One Man Band (Short) (production coordinator)
 2005: Jack-Jack Attack (Video short) (production coordinator)
 2003: Making Nemo (Video short documentary) (very special thanks)
 2003: Finding Nemo  (unit coordinator: digital final - as Dana Leigh Murray)

Awards and nominations
 Nominated: Academy Award for Best Animated Short Film (Lou)
 Nominated: San Francisco International Film Festival — Golden Gate Award for Best Family Film (Lou)
 Nominated: South by Southwest — SXSW Grand Jury Award for Animated Short (Lou)
 Won: Golden Globe Award for Best Animated Feature Film (Soul)
 Won: Producers Guild of America Award for Best Animated Motion Picture (Soul)
 Won: Annie Award for Best Animated Feature (Soul)
 Won: Academy Award for Best Animated Feature (Soul)

References

External links
 

Living people
Pixar people
American film producers
American animators
American animated film producers
American women animators
American women film producers
Year of birth missing (living people)
Producers who won the Best Animated Feature Academy Award